Division of Blood is the sixth studio album by Greek thrash metal band Suicidal Angels, released on 27 May 2016. It is their fourth album for NoiseArt Records, and the third album in a row to enter the German official album charts.

This time, the whole production took place at Soundlodge Studios, based in Rhauderfehn, Germany. All drums, guitars, bass, vocals were recorded there during autumn 2015 by Jörg Uken who also mixed and mastered the album afterwards. It is their first album to feature Gus Drax on lead guitar.

Track listing 
All music and arrangements by Nick and Orfeas; All lyrics by Nick.

Personnel 
Suicidal Angels
 Nick Melissourgos – lead vocals, rhythm guitar, lead guitar, production
 Aggelos Lelikakis – bass
 Orfeas Tzortzopoulos – drums
 Gus Drax – lead guitar

Production
 Jörg Uken – production, mixing, mastering
 Nick Melissourgos – production
 Edward Repka – cover art

References 

2016 albums